Voices from the FIFA World Cup is a compilation album with various artists, released in 2006 by Sony BMG. This album is the official music album of the 2006 FIFA World Cup in Germany

Track listing (International)
Disc 1
 "The Time of Our Lives" - Il Divo and Toni Braxton (The Official 2006 FIFA World Cup Song)
 "Hips Don't Lie" (Bamboo) (2006 FIFA World Cup Mix) - Shakira featuring Wyclef Jean
 "Your Song" - Elton John
 "Thank You" - Dido
 "Woman in Love" - Barbra Streisand
 "Because Of You" - Kelly Clarkson
 "Truly Madly Deeply" - Savage Garden
 "Why" - Annie Lennox
 "Just the Way You Are" - Billy Joel
 "Hero" - Mariah Carey
 "I'll Stand By You" - The Pretenders
 "Reach" - Gloria Estefan

Disc 2
 "Will You Be There" - Michael Jackson
 "Free Your Mind" - En Vogue
 "By Your Side" - Sade
 "I Believe In You" - Il Divo and Celine Dion
 "Bridge Over Troubled Water" - Simon & Garfunkel
 "Un-Break My Heart" - Toni Braxton
 "Ev'ry Time We Say Goodbye" - Rod Stewart
 "Bad Day" - Daniel Powter
 "Wind Beneath My Wings" - Bette Midler
 "One Moment in Time" - Whitney Houston
 "Always on My Mind" - Elvis Presley
 "Celebrate the Day (Zeit, Dass Sich Was Dreht, in Germany, Switzerland, Liechtenstein and Austria)" -  Herbert Grönemeyer and Amadou et Mariam (The Official 2006 FIFA World Cup Anthem)

Bonus tracks:
 "Earth Song" - Michael Jackson
 "Praying for time" - George Michael
 "Wonderwall" - Oasis
 "You Raise Me Up" - Westlife
 "Born to Try" - Delta Goodrem
 "Here's to the Heroes" - Kane Alexander
 "One Day in Your Life" - Anastacia
 "Believer" - Rogue Traders
 "Learn to Fly" - Shannon Noll
 "I Believe I Can Fly" - R. Kelly
 "Another Day in Paradise" - Phil Collins
 "Private Emotion" - Ricky Martin
 "Rush" - Aly & AJ
 "Let's Do It Again" - TLC
 "Maria Maria" - Carlos Santana
 "Nessun dorma" - Amici Forever
 "Più bella cosa" - Eros Ramazzotti
 "You and Me" - Lifehouse
 "If I Ain't Got You" - Alicia Keys
 "Sunrise" - Simply Red
 "7 Seconds" - Youssou N'Dour feat Neneh Cherry
 "The Closest Thing to Crazy" - Katie Melua
 "Life" - Des'ree
 "Shiver" - Natalie Imbruglia
 "Your Game" - Will Young
 "Everyday" - Bon Jovi
 "Elevation" - U2

Chart positions

See also
 List of FIFA World Cup songs and anthems

References

FIFA World Cup albums
2006 FIFA World Cup
2006 compilation albums
Sony BMG compilation albums